Eala is a genus of moths in the subfamily Lymantriinae. The genus was erected by Cyril Leslie Collenette in 1937.

Species
Eala hemiluta Collenette, 1937 Congo
Eala lasia Collenette, 1957 Nigeria

References

Lymantriinae
Noctuoidea genera